The building at 614 Main Street in Barnstable, Massachusetts is a modest commercial building built in 1910, during the area's main period of development as a commercial district.  Stylistically, the single story wood-frame building is similar to 606 Main Street, although it has more obvious Arts and Crafts features, including exposed rafters.  The building has a gable roof, whose front slope includes a shed-roof dormer providing access to storage space above the stores.

The building was listed on the National Register of Historic Places in 1987.

See also
National Register of Historic Places listings in Barnstable County, Massachusetts

References

Commercial buildings on the National Register of Historic Places in Massachusetts
Buildings and structures in Barnstable, Massachusetts
National Register of Historic Places in Barnstable, Massachusetts